Sarocha Kamonkhon (born 15 August 1997) is a Thai professional racing cyclist, who currently rides for UCI Women's Continental Team .

References

External links

1997 births
Living people
Sarocha Kamonkhon
Place of birth missing (living people)
Sarocha Kamonkhon